The 2017 Honkbal Hoofdklasse season is the 87th season of baseball in the Netherlands.

Clubs

Seven teams participated in the 2017 season.

Regular season

Play-off

Relegation/promotion play-offs

References

Honkbal Hoofdklasse
2017 in baseball